Belinda Lee Xin Yu (born 8 Jul 1977) is a Singaporean television host and actress.

Career
Lee was formerly a MTV Asia VJ in 1998.

She was prominently a full-time Mediacorp artiste from 2002 to 2016. She has hosted shows including Find Me a Singaporean, The Places We Live In (2013) and Somewhere Out There (2015). In 2014, she was appointed World Vision's goodwill ambassador.

In 2015, her first English book was published; Larger Than Life: Celebrating The Human Spirit features ten extraordinary people who she met in her years spent hosting travel programmes, such as Find Me a Singaporean and The Places We Live In. All royalties will be donated to World Vision.

Lee left Mediacorp in 2016 upon conclusion of her contract with Mediacorp.

Filmography

Infotainment/variety shows

Television

Film

Bibliography

Endorsements 
 2004: GINVERA 绿茶沐浴露代言人
 2007: L'oreal Matrix Hair
 2009: Johnson & Johnson Heathly eye contact lens
 2012: Colorplay RF
 2016: Astalift Pure Collagen products

Accolades

References

External links
 

Living people
Singaporean television personalities
Singaporean television actresses
Singaporean film actresses
1977 births